Karagay is the name of several rural localities in Russia:
Karagay, Altai Republic, a selo in Karagayskoye Rural Settlement of Ust-Koksinsky District of the Altai Republic
Karagay, Arkhangelsky District, Republic of Bashkortostan, a village in Uzunlarovsky Selsoviet of Arkhangelsky District of the Republic of Bashkortostan
Karagay, Kuyurgazinsky District, Republic of Bashkortostan, a village in Ilkineyevsky Selsoviet of Kuyurgazinsky District of the Republic of Bashkortostan
Karagay, Republic of Khakassia, a village in Butrakhtinsky Selsoviet of Tashtypsky District of the Republic of Khakassia
Karagay, Kirov Oblast, a village in Pashinsky Rural Okrug of Afanasyevsky District of Kirov Oblast
Karagay, Perm Krai, a selo in Karagaysky District of Perm Krai
Karagay, Samara Oblast, a settlement in Krasnoarmeysky District of Samara Oblast
Karagay, Republic of Tatarstan, a village in Leninogorsky District of the Republic of Tatarstan